Actinidia pilosula is a species of plant in the Actinidiaceae family. It is endemic to China. The Tibetan people of Shangri-La and nearby areas eat its fruit.

References

External links

pilosula
Endemic flora of China
Vulnerable plants
Taxonomy articles created by Polbot